Christelle N'Garsanet (born June 23, 1983) is an Ivorian female professional basketball player.

Missouri statistics

Source

References

External links 
Profile at eurobasket.com
Southern Illinois Salukis coaching bio

1983 births
Living people
Centers (basketball)
Illinois Central Cougars women's basketball coaches
Illinois Central Cougars women's basketball players
Ivorian women's basketball players
Missouri Tigers women's basketball players
New York Liberty draft picks
New York Liberty players
Southern Illinois Salukis women's basketball coaches
Sportspeople from Abidjan